The 2013 Cactus Pheasant Classic was held from October 24 to 27 at the Brooks Curling Club in Brooks, Alberta as part of the 2013–14 World Curling Tour. The event was in a triple knockout format, and the purse for the event was CAD$70,000.

Winnipeg's Mike McEwen defeated Switzerland's Sven Michel in the final.

Teams
The teams are listed as follows:

Playoffs

References

External links

Cactus Pheasant Classic
Brooks, Alberta